Lu Min (鲁敏, born 1973) is a Chinese fiction writer based in Nanjing. She won the 5th Lu Xun Literary Prize, among many other awards.

Lu Min was born in Dongtai to a teacher mother and an engineer father. She worked as a post office clerk, a secretary, a company planner, a reporter and a civil servant before her writing career. While working in a post office in 1993, she attended novelist Su Tong who came in to purchase a stamp, and "felt the spirit of literature in his presence and was so affected that she thought of resigning immediately to go home and write".

Lu Min's 2012 novel Dinner for Six has been translated into English, German, Serbian, Spanish, Swedish and Turkish. It has also been adapted into a 2017 film Youth Dinner.

She was the featured author of the journal Chinese Literature Today in 2021.

Works translated to English

References

1973 births
People from Dongtai
Writers from Yancheng
Living people
Chinese women novelists
Chinese women short story writers
People's Republic of China novelists
People's Republic of China short story writers
Short story writers from Jiangsu